Dichondra argentea, the silver ponysfoot or silver nickel vine, is a species of flowering plant in the family Convolvulaceae. It is disjunctly distributed in New Mexico, Texas, Mexico, Colombia, Bolivia, northwest Argentina, and southeast Brazil, and has gone extinct in Arizona. There is a cultivar, 'Silver Falls'.

References

Convolvulaceae
Flora of the South-Central United States
Flora of Mexico
Flora of Colombia
Flora of Bolivia
Flora of Northwest Argentina
Flora of Southeast Brazil
Plants described in 1806